Heinrich Hess or von Hess etc. may refer to:

  (1719–1784), German writer
 Heinrich von Heß (1788–1870), Austrian fieldmarshal
 Heinrich Maria von Hess (1798–1863), German painter
 Heinrich Hess (canoeist) (1928–1993), Saar sprint canoer
 Heinrich Hess (footballer), Swiss footballer
 Heinrich Hess (mountaineer) (1857–1944), Austrian alpinist